Midfield is a town in Jefferson County, Alabama, United States, located two miles south of the Birmingham suburb of Fairfield. It incorporated in 1953. As of the 2010 census, it had a population of 5,365.

Geography
Midfield is located at  (33.455874, -86.927044).

Demographics

2000 census
As of the census of 2000, there were 5,626 people, 2,186 households, and 1,532 families residing in this town. The racial makeup of the city was 39.28% White, 59.49% Black or African American, 0.09% Native American, 0.43% Asian, 0.04% Pacific Islander, 0.11% from other races, and 0.57% from two or more races. 0.14% of the population were Hispanic or Latino of any race.

There were 2,186 households, out of which 36.3% had children under the age of 18 living with them, 44.4% were married couples living together, 21.5% had a female householder with no husband present, and 29.9% were non-families. 27.0% of all households were made up of individuals, and 12.6% had someone living alone who was 65 years of age or older. The average household size was 2.57 and the average family size was 3.13.

In the town the population was distributed with 28.8% under the age of 18, 7.9% from 18 to 24, 30.8% from 25 to 44, 19.4% from 45 to 64, and 13.1% who were 65 years of age or older. The median age was 35 years. For every 100 females, there were 85.6 males. For every 100 females age 18 and over, there were 79.2 males.

The median income for a household in the city was $31,378, and the median income for a family was $36,281. Males had a median income of $30,087 versus $25,386 for females. The per capita income for the city was $15,729. About 12.4% of families and 16.0% of the population were below the poverty line, including 22.1% of those under age 18 and 7.7% of those age 65 or over.

2010 census
As of the census of 2010, there were 5,365 people, 1,999 households, and 1,398 families residing in this town. The racial makeup of the city was 81.6% Black or African American, 16.4% White, 0.1% Native American, 0.2% Asian, 0.0% Pacific Islander, 0.7% from other races, and 0.9% from two or more races. 1.4% of the population were Hispanic or Latino of any race.

There were 1,999 households, out of which 32.4% had children under the age of 18 living with them, 32.3% were married couples living together, 31.2% had a female householder with no husband present, and 30.1% were non-families. 25.7% of all households were made up of individuals, and 8.3% had someone living alone who was 65 years of age or older. The average household size was 2.68 and the average family size was 3.24.

In the town the population was distributed with 27.7% under the age of 18, 10.3% from 18 to 24, 25.1% from 25 to 44, 27.8% from 45 to 64, and 9.1% who were 65 years of age or older. The median age was 34.4 years. For every 100 females, there were 82.8 males. For every 100 females age 18 and over, there were 81.2 males.

The median income for a household in the city was $37,138, and the median income for a family was $46,444. Males had a median income of $39,420 versus $28,648 for females. The per capita income for the city was $16,496. About 15.6% of families and 15.9% of the population were below the poverty line, including 21.9% of those under age 18 and 12.1% of those age 65 or over.

2020 census

As of the 2020 United States census, there were 5,211 people, 1,855 households, and 1,273 families residing in the city.

Notable people
 Ron Casey, former editor for the Birmingham News
 Michael Gibbons, American boxer
 J. J. Nelson, All-American wide receiver for the UAB Blazers

References

External links
Official website
Midfield Area Chamber of Commerce

Cities in Alabama
Cities in Jefferson County, Alabama
Birmingham metropolitan area, Alabama